Sellenberg is the name of hills in Germany:

 Žale, Kamnik, Slovenia, known as Sellenberg in the 15th century

See also
 Šelenberg, a local name for Zelen Breg, Slovenia
 Selberg (disambiguation)
 Sellenberk, Romania
 Schellenberg (disambiguation)
 Stellenberg, Bellville, South Africa